Pam Muñoz Ryan is an American writer for children and young adults, particularly in the Multicultural genre.

Biography
Muñoz Ryan was born in Bakersfield, California. She is half Mexican with Basque, Italian, and Oklahoman cultural influences.

Muñoz Ryan has written over forty books for young people, including picture books, early readers, and middle grade and young adult novels. She has been the author recipient of the NEA's Human and Civil Rights Award, the Virginia Hamilton Literary Award for multicultural literature, and the Ludington Award for body of work. She is also the 2018 U.S. nominee for the International Hans Christian Andersen Award. Her novel Esperanza Rising was commissioned as a play by the Minneapolis Children's Theatre and has been performed in venues around the US including the Goodman Theatre in Chicago, and the Cutler Majestic Theatre in Boston.

Born Pamela Jeanne Banducci in Bakersfield, California, on December 25, 1951, her last name was changed before she attended school to match the name of her parents, Hope Bell and the man she considered her real father, Donald Bell. As Pamela Bell, she attended McKinley Elementary and Longfellow Elementary. As a child, she did not fit in with the other children. Rather than being outside with friends, Muñoz Ryan was riding her bike to the library. She also briefly took music lessons in both piano and violin, but after her violin broke, she stopped taking lessons. Muñoz Ryan attended Washington Jr. High, Bakersfield High School, and Bakersfield Community College. She then attended San Diego State University where she received a bachelor's degree. She married James Ryan in 1975. An early childhood teacher, he worked for the Escondido, California, school district for three years before they started their family. After her four children were born, she became the director of an early childhood program and went back to school to get her master's degree in Post-Secondary Education with the intention of teaching Children's Literature in college. When she finished her graduate program, she became interested in writing, and at the encouragement of her agent, Kendra Marcus, included her family name, Muñoz, to her signature, to reflect her Mexican heritage.

Selected bibliography
Riding Freedom (1998)
Esperanza Rising (2000)
Becoming Naomi León (2004)
Paint the Wind (2007)
The Dreamer, illustrated by Peter Sís (2010)
Echo (2015)
Mañanaland (2020)

Awards
Echo
2016 Newbery Honor Books
2016 Américas Award
2016 Audie Award
2015 Kirkus Prize
2015 New York Historical Society Book Prize
2015 NAPPA Gold Award
The Dreamer, illustrated by Peter Sís
 2011 Pen USA Award
 2011 Pura Belpré Medal
 2011 Américas Award
 2011 Nautilus Book Award
 2010 Boston Globe-Horn Book Honor
 2010 NAPPA Gold Award
 Carla Cohen Free Speech Award
 Deutscher Jugendliteraturapreis-Germany-Der Traumer
Becoming Naomi León
 2006 Pura Belpré Honor Medal
 2005 ALA Schneider Family Book Award
 2005 Tomás Rivera Mexican American Book Award
 Américas Award Commended
When Marian Sang, illustrated by Brian Selznick
  2004 Norman Sugarman Award for Distinguished Biography
  2003 Orbis Pictus Award for Outstanding Nonfiction for Children
 2003 Flora Stieglitz Straus Award-Bank Street College
Riding Freedom, illustrated by Brian Selznick
 2000 Arizona Grand Canyon Reader Award
 2000 Arkansas Simon Young Reader Honor
 1998 Parenting Magazine’s Reading Magic Award

Esperanza Rising
 2001 Los Angeles Times Book Prize Finalist
 2001 Southern California Judy Lopez Award
 2001 Arizona Young Adult Book Award

References

External links
 
  (Ryan, Pam Muñoz)

1951 births
Living people
20th-century American novelists
21st-century American novelists
20th-century American women writers
21st-century American women writers
American women novelists
American writers of Mexican descent
Hispanic and Latino American novelists
Kirkus Prize winners